"The Stall" is the third episode of the American murder mystery comedy-drama television series Poker Face. The episode was written by executive story editor Wyatt Cain and directed by executive producer Iain B. MacDonald. It was released on Peacock on January 26, 2023, alongside "Dead Man's Hand", "The Night Shift" and "Rest in Metal".

The series follows Charlie Cale, a woman with the ability to detect if people are lying. After using her ability to win poker tournaments, she is caught by a powerful casino owner in Laughlin. Rather than banning her from his casino, he gives her a job as a waitress. After finding that her friend has been found dead, Charlie uncovered a plot where the owner's son ordered her murder to protect a powerful client. She is now on the run after exposing the casino, with head of security Cliff going after her. The episode follows Charlie, who arrives in Texas at a BBQ joint. She befriends the cook, accidentally causing him to become vegan. When he is found dead, Charlie sets out to find what really happened.

The episode received positive reviews from critics, who praised Natasha Lyonne's performance, guest actors, humor, score and writing.

Plot
In rural Texas, Taffy Boyle (Lil Rel Howery) runs a popular BBQ joint with his brother George (Larry Brown). However, George informs Taffy he is quitting the business, as he turned vegan and cannot bring himself to cook animals. Taffy is not an expert cook and has also asked for a loan from shady organizations in Dallas, which must he pay. Taffy accepts George's request and drinks a beer with him. At night, he hosts a radio talk show and leaves for 16 minutes with a pre-recorded segment about sausage. He goes to George's trailer home, where George has passed out from drugged beer. Taffy locks the trailer home and uses a hose to suffocate George via a meat smoker. Taffy is attacked by a wild dog who barks at him, forcing him to hit it on the head to avoid detection. He resumes the talk show in the nick of time.

A few days before, Charlie (Natasha Lyonne) arrives in the area. She is forced to keep a feisty dog who jumps into her car and will not leave. The dog runs into the BBQ joint, causing damage to the food, prompting Taffy to demand $300 in reimbursement. As she does not want to leave any trace, George offers her to pay back the money by working with him. During the next days, George and Charlie bond over his cooking methods, so she hands him a few DVDs to pass time. The next day, George has a change of heart in his profession after watching Okja. After informing Taffy that he is quitting, he talks with Charlie about his uncertain future, but Charlie is forced to go back to work before George explains his only plan.

At night, Taffy returns from his talk show, informing George's wife Mandy (Danielle Macdonald) that their plan is complete. An employee sees George's trailer home filled with smoke, which provides Taffy with an alibi. The police conclude that George committed suicide. The BBQ joint holds a funeral for George, with Taffy stating that he plans to keep the business going to honor him. On the road, Charlie finds the dog, which turns out not to be dead, but only badly wounded. She takes the dog to the veterinarian, who states that the dog was attacked with a piece of wood. Charlie notes that the wood's scent is the same as the pecan wood that George used for the meat. She raises her suspicions to Taffy, who rebuffs any of the events and even warns her to leave Texas and never return, indirectly threatening to use a shotgun to scare her.

Charlie sneaks into George's trailer home, finding that dental floss was used to lock the door from outside. She is caught by Mandy, who sits down for a beer with her. Charlie expresses her suspicions and reveals her ability to detect lies, unaware that Mandy is involved with Taffy in the murder. This prompts Mandy to tell Taffy about this, as well as knowing about the dog attack. Charlie tests the distance that Taffy could have used in going from the radio station to the trailer, suspecting that he pre-recorded the live talk. She suspects Mandy is involved as the talk needed a certain question that Mandy provided, which she deflects by stating it is a common practice. She warns her to leave, as she does not have any proof.

The next day, Charlie confronts Taffy. She found that George's beer bottle was cleaned and replaced with Ambien, and that Taffy left the station because the recording did not include the sound of a passing train that night. She then has one of Taffy's radio co-workers, Austin (Shane Paul McGhie), imitate Taffy and call Mandy, telling her he wants to confess. Charlie distracts Taffy long enough for the police and Mandy to arrive, with Mandy having reached authorities first to identify Taffy as the killer. While accompanying a police officer in the cruiser, Austin broadcasts Mandy's confession, leading to her arrest as well. Charlie leaves the area, while Austin keeps the dog under his care.

Production

Development
The series was announced in March 2021, with Rian Johnson serving as creator, writer, director and executive producer. Johnson stated that the series would delve into "the type of fun, character driven, case-of-the-week mystery goodness I grew up watching." The episode was directed by executive producer Iain B. MacDonald, while executive story editor Wyatt Cain wrote it. This was MacDonald's first directing credit and Cain's first writing credit.

Casting
The announcement of the series included that Natasha Lyonne would serve as the main lead actress. She was approached by Johnson about working on a procedural project together, with Lyonne as the lead character. As Johnson explained, the role was "completely cut to measure for her."

Due to the series' procedural aspects, the episodes feature several guest stars. Johnson was inspired by the amount of actors who guest starred on Columbo, wanting to deem each guest star as the star of the episode, which allowed them to attract many actors. The episode featured appearances by Danielle Macdonald, Lil Rel Howery and Shane Paul McGhie, who were announced to guest star in May, June and August 2022, respectively. Howery described his character as "it's very villainous, and I enjoyed everything about it."

Critical reception
"The Stall" received extremely positive reviews from critics. Saloni Gajjar of The A.V. Club gave the episode an "A" grade and wrote, "Poker Face is a shining example of a show built around its star. It's a love letter to Lyonne, who fits into Charlie's shoes like a pro. Her trademark wit, deadpan one-liner deliveries, and surprising depth transform PF into more than a delectable Rian Johnson mystery-of-the-week drama. Here, Charlie doles out sarcastic rapid-fire remarks to an audience of one: a pooch she's trying to get rid of. Lyonne is essentially making the most of her screen time, dialing up the comedy as the show increases its complex suspense in 'The Stall.'"

Alan Sepinwall wrote, "The episode has Natasha Lyonne arguing with a temperamental, flatulent dog for one long stretch, and her tasting lots of pieces of wood for another. Oh, and in between, it has perhaps the first pop culture murder ever inspired by a viewing of Okja. So, yeah, it's a fun one." Amanda Whiting of Vulture gave the episode a 3 star rating out of 5 and wrote, "Part of the fun of Poker Face is watching the series tease out the limitations and implications of Charlie's ability to separate bull-truth from bullshit. In the pilot episode, we learned her gift can work over video recording; in 'The Stall', we find out that it doesn't work over sound waves alone."

References

External links
 

Poker Face (TV series) episodes
2023 American television episodes
Television episodes set in Texas